Trochus maculatus, common name the maculated top shell, is a species of sea snail, a marine gastropod mollusk in the family Trochidae, the top snails.

Description
The size of the shell varies between 25 mm and 65 mm. This is an excessively variable form. The solid, heavy shell has a conical shape and is falsely umbilicate. The spire is strictly conic, or swollen and somewhat convex below, acuminate above, or sometimes constricted around the upper part of the body whorl. The about 10 whorls are quite planulate, or concave toward the upper, convex toward the lower margins. The body whorl is carinated at the periphery and flat beneath. The color of upper surface consists of longitudinal stripes or flames of brown, purplish, magenta, rose or coral red on a ground of white, corneous, pink or olive-tinted. The flames occupy more space than the ground color or vice versa.  Sometimes the coloration consists of very narrow numerous radiating lines, usually broken into tessellations articulating the lirae. The base of the shell is radiately painted with zigzag flames, or more frequently, narrow lines, either continuous or interrupted, often broken into a maculated or a finely tessellated pattern, sometimes unicolored lilac, or even white. The sculpture of the upper surface consists of spiral beaded lirae, usually numbering six to eight on each whorl. The beads are either laterally compressed like longitudinal folds or rounded and separate. The base of the shell is concentrically sculptured with numerous (about 10) fine, more or less beaded lira. The aperture is transverse subtrigonal. The outer lip is lirate within. The basal margin is slightly curved and four or five dentate. The parietal wall is sometimes callused and lirate, sometimes smooth. The heavy columella is subvertical or oblique, its margin irregularly dentate or nearly smooth, usually with a deep notch at its union with the basal lip. The umbilical tract is funnel-shaped, spirally feebly lirate or nearly smooth, not conspicuously bi-lirate.

Distribution
T. maculatus occurs in the Red Sea, the Indo-Pacific Ocean. and Australia (Northern Territory, Queensland, Western Australia).

References

 Lamarck, J.B. 1822. Histoire naturelle des Animaux sans Vertèbres. Paris : J.B. Lamarck Vol. 7 711 pp
 Deshayes, G.P. 1843. Histoire naturelle des animaux sans vertèbres. Paris : J.B. Baillière Vol. 9 728 pp
 Menke, C.T. 1843. Molluscorum Novae Hollandiae Specimen in Libraria Aulica Hahniana. Hannoverae : Libraria Aulica Hahniana pp. 1–46.
 Hanley, S. 1855. Ipsa Linnaei Conchylia. The shells of Linnaeus, determined from his manuscripts and collection. London : Williams & Norgate 556 pp., 5 pls.
 Brazier, J. 1877. Continuation of the Mollusca collected during the Chevert Expedition. Proceedings of the Linnean Society of New South Wales 2: 41-53 
 Troschel, F.H. 1879. Das Gebiss der Schnecken, zur Begründung einer Natürlichen Classification [by J. Thiele, written after Troschel's death]. Berlin : Nicolaische Verlagsbuchhandlung Vol. II 237 pp.
 Melvill, J.C. & Standen, R. 1899. Report on the marine Mollusca obtained during the first expedition of Prof. A.C. Haddon to the Torres Straits in 1888-89. Journal of the Linnean Society of London, Zoology 27: 150–206, pls 1-2
 Hedley, C. 1907. The Mollusca of Mast Head Reef, Capricorn Group, Queensland, part II. Proceedings of the Linnean Society of New South Wales 32: 476–513, pls 16-21
 Schepman, M.M. 1908. Prosobranchia (excluding Heteropoda and parasitic Prosobranchia). Rhipidoglossa and Docoglossa. With an appendix by Prof. R. Bergh [Pectinobranchiata]. Siboga-Expéditie Report 49(1): 1–108, 9 pls
 Iredale, T. 1929. Queensland molluscan notes, No. 1. Memoirs of the Queensland Museum 9(3): 261–297, pls 30-31
 Demond, J. 1957. Micronesian reef associated gastropods. Pacific Science 11(3): 275–341, fig. 2, pl. 1.
 Rippingale, O.H. & McMichael, D.F. 1961. Queensland and Great Barrier Reef Shells. Brisbane : Jacaranda Press 210 pp
 Cotton, B.C. 1964. Molluscs of Arnhem Land. Records of the American-Australian Scientific Expedition to Arnhem Land 4 (Zoology): 9-43 
 Ladd, H.S. 1966. Chitons and gastropods (Haliotidae through Adeorbidae) from the western Pacific Islands. United States Geological Survey Professional Papers 531: 1-98 16 pls
 Maes, V.O. 1967. The littoral marine mollusks of Cocos-Keeling Islands (Indian Ocean). Proceedings of the Academy of Natural Sciences, Philadelphia 119: 93-217
 Wilson, B.R. & Gillett, K. 1971. Australian Shells: illustrating and describing 600 species of marine gastropods found in Australian waters. Sydney : Reed Books 168 pp.
 Hinton, A. 1972. Shells of New Guinea and the Central Indo-Pacific. Milton : Jacaranda Press xviii 94 pp. 
 Blackburn, H. & Green, J. 1976. Marine shells of the Darwin area. Darwin : Museums and Art Galleries Board of the Northern Territory pp. 1–23.
 Tantanasiriwong, R. 1978. An illustrated checklist of marine shelled gastropods from Phuket Island, adjacent mainland and offshore islands, Western Peninsula, Thailand. Phuket Marine Biological Center, Research Bulletin 21: 1-22, 259 figs
 Marshall, B. A. (1981). Fossil collections from Raoul Island. Appendix 1. Pp 90-91 in Lloyd, E. F. & Nathan, S. Geology and tephrochronology of Raoul Island, Kermadec Group, New Zealand. New Zealand Geological Survey Bulletin 95.
 Sharabati, D. 1984. Red Sea Shells. London : KPI Limited 128 pp.
 Drivas, J. & Jay, M. (1988). Coquillages de La Réunion et de l'Île Maurice. Collection les beautés de la nature. Delachaux et Niestlé: Neuchâtel. ISBN 2-603-00654-1. pp. 1-160.
 Wilson, B. 1993. Australian Marine Shells. Prosobranch Gastropods. Kallaroo, Western Australia : Odyssey Publishing Vol. 1 408 pp
 Richmond, M. (Ed.) (1997). A guide to the seashores of Eastern Africa and the Western Indian Ocean islands. Sida/Department for Research Cooperation, SAREC: Stockholm, Sweden. ISBN 91-630-4594-X. 448 pp.
 Jarrett, A.G. (2000) Marine Shells of the Seychelles. Carole Green Publishing, Cambridge, xiv + 149 pp. NIZT 682
 Liu, J.Y. [Ruiyu] (ed.). (2008). Checklist of marine biota of China seas. China Science Press. 1267 pp.
 Zuschin, M., Janssen, R. & Baal, C. (2009). Gastropods and their habitats from the northern Red Sea (Egypt: Safaga). Part 1: Patellogastropoda, Vetigastropoda and Cycloneritimorpha. Annalen des Naturhistorischen Museums in Wien 111[A]: 73–158.
 Fowler, O. (2016). Seashells of the Kenya coast. ConchBooks: Harxheim. Pp. 1–170.

External links
 Linnaeus, C. 1758. Systemae naturae per regna tria naturae, secundum classes, ordines, genera, species, cum characteribus, differetiis, synonymis, locis.v. Holmiae : Laurentii Salvii 824 pp
 Gmelin, J. F. (1791). Vermes. In: Gmelin J.F. (Ed.) Caroli a Linnaei Systema Naturae per Regna Tria Naturae, Ed. 13. Tome 1(6). G.E. Beer, Lipsiae
 Adams, A. 1853. Contributions towards a monograph of the Trochidae, a family of gastropodous Mollusca. Proceedings of the Zoological Society of London 1851(19): 150-192
 Reeve, L.A. 1862. Monograph of the genus Trochus. pls 1-16 in Reeve, L.A. (ed). Conchologia Iconica. London : L. Reeve & Co. Vol. 13.
 

maculatus
Gastropods described in 1758
Taxa named by Carl Linnaeus